Parks Township may refer to:

 Parks Township, Scott County, Arkansas, in Scott County, Arkansas
 Parks Township, Armstrong County, Pennsylvania

Township name disambiguation pages